Joseph Levenson Book Prize is awarded each year in memory of Joseph R. Levenson by the Association for Asian Studies to two English-language books, one whose main focus is on China before 1900 and the other for works on post-1900 China. According to the association, the prize criterion is whether the book is "the greatest contribution to increasing understanding of the history, culture, society, politics, or economy of China." While the association does not limit the discipline or period of the work, it won't consider anthologies, edited works, and pamphlets. Based on the scholarly interests of Levenson, the association gives special consideration to books that "promote the relevance of scholarship on China to the wider world of intellectual discourse."

Other prizes awarded by the AAS include the John Whitney Hall Book Prize for works on Japan or Korea, the James B. Palais Book Prize for works on Korea, and the E. Gene Smith Inner Asia Book Prize, offered biennially, honors outstanding and innovative scholarship across discipline and country of specialization for a book on Inner Asia.

Other prizes for books on China proper, Vietnam, Chinese Central Asia, Mongolia, Manchuria, Korea, or Japan, substantially after 1800 include John K. Fairbank Prize given by the American Historical Association.

List of awards

References 
 AAS CIAC Levenson Book Prize Winners Association for Asian Studies official site.
 Book awards: Levenson Prize for Books in Chinese Studies LibraryThing (Accessed March 9, 2015).

Notes

American non-fiction literary awards
Awards established in 1987
1987 establishments in Michigan